Lakiesha Williams is a biomedical engineer and an Associate Professor at the University of Florida. Williams specializes in traumatic brain injury and biomechanics. Specifically, her work involves the modelling and mechanics of soft tissue, and how outside influences affect their structure. Much of her work on repetitive brain trauma involves utilizing preclinical models to study the long term neurodegenerative effects of damages. She grew up in New Orleans, with her dad working as a carpenter.  Williams went on to become a first generation college student, college graduate, and now, an Associate Professor.

Biography

Education

Williams received a Bachelor of Science and Master of Science degrees in Biological engineering from Louisiana State University in 2001 and 2003 respectively. 

She earned her Doctor of Philosophy degree in Biomedical engineering at Mississippi State University in 2006.

Distinctions
Sigma Xi - distinguished member
National Society of Black Engineers - member
American Society of Mechanical Engineers - member
MSU President's Commission on the Status of Minorities - Committee Chair, 2017

Awards and honors
American Institute for Medical and Biological Engineering - Fellow 2020: for “outstanding contributions in traumatic brain injury research and for tireless advocacy of biomedical engineering to communities underrepresented in STEM.“
100 Most Inspiring Black Scientists- 2020: On June 19th 2020 Dr. Williams was recognized amongst colleagues as one of the most inspiring black scientists
Minority Access Incorporated - National Role Model Faculty Researcher Award (Mississippi State University), 2017
Mississippi Business Journal Top in Technology, 2017
Mississippi's Top 21 Most Wanted in Technology, 2014
Bagley College of Engineering, Mississippi State University: Hearin Faculty Excellence Award, 2010
Women of Color Magazine - Rising Star Award, 2008

Publications
Williams has over 60 publications. Her most cited work has been cited more than 90 times.

Here is a list of her most cited works, included in this number are those publications that have been cited over 40 times:

Myocardial scaffold-based cardiac tissue engineering: application of coordinated mechanical and electrical stimulations
B Wang, G Wang, F To, JR Butler, A Claude, RM McLaughlin, LN Williams. . .(2013)

Structural and biomechanical characterizations of porcine myocardial extracellular matrix
B Wang, ME Tedder, CE Perez, G Wang, AL de Jongh Curry, F To, ... (2012)

The effects of water and microstructure on the mechanical properties of bighorn sheep (Ovis canadensis) horn keratin
MW Trim, MF Horstemeyer, H Rhee, H El Kadiri, LN Williams, J Liao, ... (2011)

Hyperbolic method for prediction of prefabricated vertical drains performance
SG Chung, NK Lee, SR Kim (2009)

Hierarchical multiscale structure–property relationships of the red-bellied woodpecker (Melanerpes carolinus) beak
N Lee, MF Horstemeyer, H Rhee, B Nabors, J Liao, LN Williams (2014)

See also

Biomechanics
Traumatic brain injury
Biomedical engineering
American Institute for Medical and Biological Engineering

References

External links

American women engineers
Living people
Year of birth missing (living people)
American women scientists
Louisiana State University alumni
Mississippi State University alumni
University of Florida faculty
Biomedical engineers
American women academics
21st-century American women